Unleashed may refer to:

Art and entertainment

Film and television 
 Unleashed (2001 film), a film featuring Jeff Anderson
 Unleashed (2005 film), a 2005 martial arts film starring Jet Li
 Unleashed (2016 film), a film starring Kate Micucci
 Unleashed (TV program), a 2020 Nickelodeon reality competition series
 "Unleashed" (Angel), an episode of Angel
 "Unleashed" (Fringe), an episode of Fringe
 "Unleashed" (Gotham), an episode of Gotham
 Women of Wrestling Unleashed, a pay-per-view event
 Unleashed, a 2009 video by comedian Sam Kinison

Music 
 Unleashed (band), a Swedish death metal band
 "Unleashed", a song by Epica from the album Design Your Universe, 2009
 "Unleashed", a song by Killswitch Engage from the album Atonement, 2019

Albums
 Unleashed (Bow Wow album)
 Unleashed (Confederate Railroad album)
 Unleashed (Dannii Minogue album)
 Unleashed (Hurricane Chris album)
 Unleashed (LA Symphony album)
 Unleashed (Mark Collie album)
 Unleashed (Nashville Bluegrass Band album)
 Unleashed (Paris album)
 Unleashed (Skillet album)
 Unleashed (The U.M.C.'s album)
 Unleashed (Toby Keith album)
 Unleashed (Wolfstone album)
 Unleashed (Two Steps from Hell album), 2017
 Unleashed..., an album by The Dogs D'Amour
 Unleashed (soundtrack), a soundtrack album by Massive Attack, from the 2005 film (see above)
 Unleashed 2005, a New Zealand compilation rock album
 Unleashed, an album by Exilia
 Unleashed, an unreleased album by Lisa Scott-Lee
 Unleashed, an album by Nikki McKibbin
 Unleashed, an album by Renee Olstead
 Unleashed, an album by Ten Foot Pole

Video games 
 Dancing Stage Unleashed, a sub-series of Dance Dance Revolution games
 Godzilla: Unleashed, a 2007 Godzilla video game
 Godzilla Unleashed: Double Smash, its Nintendo DS version
 Hot Wheels Unleashed, a 2021 Hot Wheels racing game
 MX Unleashed, a 2004 racing game
 MX vs. ATV Unleashed, a 2005 crossover off-road racing game
 Shift 2: Unleashed, a 2011 racing game from the Need for Speed series
 The Sims: Unleashed, a 2002 expansion pack of pets for The Sims computer game
 Sonic Unleashed, a 2008 game in the Sonic the Hedgehog series

Other media 
Unleashed (Kimelman novel), the first book in the Sydney Rye mystery series by Emily Kimelman
 Unleashed (Humphreys novel), a 2011 novel by Sara Humphreys
 Unleashed, a novel series by Ali Sparkes
 Unleashed, an urban fantasy/YA novel by Kristopher Reisz
 Unleashed, a 2009 dance production by flamenco dancer Joaquin Cortes

Other uses 
 Unleashed (Petco), a concept store operated by the pet-store chain Petco